The 2019–20 Notre Dame Fighting Irish women's basketball team represented the University of Notre Dame during the 2019–20 NCAA Division I women's basketball season. The Fighting Irish, led by 33rd year head coach Muffet McGraw, played their home games at Edmund P. Joyce Center as members of the Atlantic Coast Conference.

The Fighting Irish finished the season 13–18 and 8–10 in ACC play to finish in a tie for ninth place.  As the tenth seed in the ACC tournament, they lost to Pittsburgh in the First Round.  The NCAA tournament and WNIT were cancelled due to the COVID-19 outbreak.

Previous season
The Fighting Irish finished the 2018–19 season at 35–4, 14–2 in ACC play to finish in a tie for first place. With a bye in the second round of the ACC women's tournament they would beat North Carolina in the quarterfinals and then would go on to beat Syracuse in the semifinals. In the rematch of the 2017 championship game the Fighting Irish would avenge that lose by beating Louisville. They received an automatic bid for the NCAA women's tournament as a number one seed in the Chicago Regional. The Fighting Irish made it to the Championship game by beating Bethune-Cookman, Michigan State, Texas A&M, Stanford, and Connecticut. In the championship game against Baylor, the Lady Bears got out to and early lead in the first quarter 25–14 and would lead at halftime by double digits 43–31. The Fighting Irish would outscore the Lady Bears in the third and fourth quarters and would have the lead 77–76 late in the fourth quarter, but Baylor found a way to win 82–81.

Offseason

Departures

2019 recruiting class

Source:

Incoming Transfers

Roster

Schedule and results

Source:

|-
!colspan=9 style=| Non-conference Regular season

|-
!colspan=9 style=| Exhibition

|-
!colspan=9 style=| ACC Regular season

|-
!colspan=9 style=| ACC Women's Tournament
|-

Rankings
2019–20 NCAA Division I women's basketball rankings

References

Notre Dame Fighting Irish women's basketball seasons
Notre Dame
Notre Dame Fighting Irish
Notre Dame Fighting Irish